Ooni Olojo was the 31st Ooni of Ife, a paramount traditional ruler of Ile Ife, the ancestral home of the Yorubas. He succeeded Ooni Adejinle and was succeeded by  
Ooni Okiti.

References

Oonis of Ife
Yoruba history